Center Stage, also known as Actress and Yuen Ling-yuk, is a 1991 Hong Kong film, directed by Stanley Kwan.

Maggie Cheung won Best Actress award at Berlin International Film Festival in 1992 for her delicate portraiture of silent film star Ruan Lingyu (1910–1935).

Plot summary
The film is based on a true story: the tragic life of China's first prima donna of the silver screen, Ruan Lingyu. This movie chronicles her rise to fame as a movie actress in Shanghai during the 1930s. Nicknamed the "Chinese Garbo," Ruan Lingyu began her acting career when she was 16 and committed suicide at 24.

The film alternates between present scenes (production talks between director Kwan, Cheung, and co-star Carina Lau, interviews of witnesses who knew Ruan), re-creation scenes with Cheung (as Ruan, acting inside this movie), and extracts from Ruan's original films including her final two films The Goddess (1934) and New Women (1935).

Cast

Maggie Cheung as Ruan Lingyu
Chin Han as Tang Jishan
Lawrence Ng as Zhang Damin
Tony Leung Ka-fai as Cai Chusheng
Carina Lau as Li Lili
Cecilia Yip as Lim Cho Cho
Waise Lee as Lai Man-Wai
Paul Chang Chung as Luo Mingyou
Hsiao Hsiang as He Aying (Ruan's mother)
Maryanna Yip as Lai Cheuk-Cheuk
Yumiko Cheng as Child actress
Fu Chong as Nie Er
Xue Guoping as Jin Yan
Sun Dongguang as Sun Yu
Xiao Rongsheng as Wu Yonggang
Zheng Dali as Zheng Junli
Zhou Jie as Liu Qiong
Huang Daliang as Wu Chengyu
Claude Monges as Mr. Skinner
Carrie Lanese as Mrs. Skinner

Two actors are the sons of their characters: Sun Dongguang is the son of director Sun Yu, and Zheng Dali is the son of actor Zheng Junli.

Music
The theme song "Zangxin" ("Burying the Heart") was composed by Taiwanese singer-songwriter Johnny Chen and recorded by Taiwanese singer Tracy Huang. It won Best Original Film Song at the 12th Hong Kong Film Awards.

The film also contains a scene in which Lianhua Film Company actors sang the "Dalu Ge" ("The Big Road Song") composed by Nie Er, which would become the theme song for Sun Yu's 1934 anti-Japanese film The Big Road.

Reception

Awards
Golden Horse Awards, 1991
Best Leading Actress - Maggie Cheung
Best Cinematography - Poon Hang Sang
Best Feature Film (nominated)
Best Director - Stanley Kwan (nominated)
42nd Berlin International Film Festival
Silver Bear for Best Actress - Maggie Cheung
Chicago International Film Festival, 1992
Silver Hugo Award for Best Actress - Maggie Cheung
1993 Hong Kong Film Awards
Best Actress - Maggie Cheung
Best Cinematography - Poon Hang Sang
Best Art Direction - Pok Yuk Mok
Best Original Film Score - Johnny Chen
Best Original Film Song - Johnny Chen

Recognition
Prominent American film critic Jonathan Rosenbaum picked the film as his favorite of the 1990s.

References

External links

 Center Stage Synopsis at 3continents.com

1990s Cantonese-language films
1990s Mandarin-language films
1992 films
1990s biographical drama films
Hong Kong biographical drama films
Films set in Shanghai
Films directed by Stanley Kwan
1991 drama films
1991 films
1992 drama films
Biographical films about actors
1990s Hong Kong films